"In Love with a Girl" is a song recorded by American singer Gavin DeGraw and was released as the lead single from DeGraw's self-titled second studio album, released on February 5, 2008.

A previously-unreleased alternate version produced by Max Martin, who "initially worked on the song", was included on DeGraw's 2014 compilation Finest Hour: The Best of Gavin DeGraw.

Music video
The music video premiered on March 25, 2008, on Yahoo! Music. Kristin Cavallari plays his love interest in the video, which opens with a big-box store (Sears) closing while Kristin hides out of sight under a kiosk. She then receives a text message saying "I'm Here XOXO", and then opens the door to her mysterious boyfriend, later revealed to be DeGraw. Together, they then wander aimlessly around the mall, video taping their antics while simultaneously avoiding a security guard who is working the night shift. Scenes are also included with DeGraw playing the piano while his band, including his touring drummer at the time Landon Ashworth performs the song. The video ends with the two leaving the store and never being discovered by the guard.
The video can be viewed on DeGraw's official channel on YouTube. As of October 2022, the music video has gained over 14 million views.
The video was ranked on VH1 as the 21st best music video of 2008 on the Top 40 Videos of 2008.

Critical reception
Katie Hasty of Billboard commented: ""In Love with a Girl" opens with heavily distorted guitars as minor chords roll through, but be not deceived: Lyrically, the track is happy, with the 30-year-old songwriter heralding a girl that "understands." One flaw beleaguers DeGraw's normally dependable croon: the unnecessary presence of auto-tuning, which is mightily distracting. Beyond that, "Girl" is a rocking home run in the same ballpark as "I Don't Want to Be." The chorus is buoyant, backed with idyllic drum tracks alongside, driving each word-heavy verse, as DeGraw's snappy piano lines may have fans playing, heaven forbid, air piano."

Charts

Weekly charts

Year-end charts

Certifications

References

2008 songs
2008 singles
Gavin DeGraw songs
Music videos directed by Wayne Isham
Song recordings produced by Max Martin
Song recordings produced by Howard Benson
J Records singles